The following list of mines in Belgium is subsidiary to the lists of mines in Europe article and Lists of mines articles. This list contains working, defunct and future mines in the country and is organised by the primary mineral output(s) and province. For practical purposes stone, marble and other quarries may be included in this list. Operational mines are demarcated by bold typeface, future mines are demarcated in italics.

Coal
Blegny-Mine
Bois du Cazier
Bois du Luc
Coal mine of Hasard de Cheratte
Coal mine du Gouffre
Grand Hornu

Flint
Neolithic flint mines of Spiennes

Zinc
Vieille Montagne

Belgium